Neoraimondia arequipensis, synonym Neoraimondia macrostibas, is a tree-like cactus (family Cactaceae) native to western Peru. It was first described in 1835 as Cereus arequipensis.

It is also the source of one ingredient in the psychoactive beverage cimora.

References

Flora of Peru
Plants described in 1835
Cactoideae